Wesley Girls High School may refer to:

 Wesley Girls' Senior High School, Ghana
 Wesley Girls High School, Secunderabad, India